is a railway station of the Chūō Main Line, East Japan Railway Company (JR East) in the Isawa-Matsumoto neighborhood of the city of Fuefuki, Yamanashi Prefecture, Japan. It is also a freight terminal for the Japan Freight Railway Company (JR Freight).

Lines
Isawa-Onsen Station is served by the Chūō Main Line, and is 127.8 kilometers from the terminus of the line at Tokyo Station.

Station layout
The station consists of two ground level opposed side platforms serving two tracks, with the station building located above the platforms. The station has a Midori no Madoguchi staffed ticket office.

Platforms

History 
The JGR became the JNR (Japanese National Railways) after the end of World War II. Scheduled freight services were discontinued from March 1985. With the dissolution and privatization of the JNR on April 1, 1987, the station came under the joint control of the East Japan Railway Company and the Japan Freight Railway Company. The station was named to its present name on April 1, 1993. Automated turnstiles using the Suica IC Card system came into operation from October 16, 2004.

Passenger statistics
In fiscal 2017, the station was used by an average of 2,961 passengers daily (boarding passengers only).

Surrounding area
 former Kasugai town hall
 Kasugai Elementary School

Surroundings
 Isawa Onsen

 Fuefuki City Hall
 WINS Isawa (Off course betting facilities of JRA)

Gallery

See also
 List of railway stations in Japan

References

 Miyoshi Kozo. Chuo-sen Machi to eki Hyaku-niju nen. JT Publishing (2009)

External links
JR East Isawa-onsen Station

Railway stations in Yamanashi Prefecture
Railway stations in Japan opened in 1903
Chūō Main Line
Stations of East Japan Railway Company
Stations of Japan Freight Railway Company
Fuefuki, Yamanashi